Anugrah Narayan Singh is an Indian politician from the Indian National Congress party. He is a four-time Member of the Legislative Assembly (MLA) from Allahabad North Assembly Constituency in Allahabad of Uttar Pradesh.This time Uttrakhand congress president

Career 
Bachelor of Arts in 1969 & LLB in 1972 from Allahabad University. Anugrah Narayan Singh was the president of Allahabad University and won the election by highest margin until now.

He served as the MLA of Allahabad North seat for four terms by winning elections in 1985, 1989, 2007 and 2012.

He lost his seat in the 2017 Uttar Pradesh Assembly election to Harshvardhan Bajpai of the Bharatiya Janata Party.

References 

Living people
Members of the Uttar Pradesh Legislative Assembly
Year of birth missing (living people)